Robert Thomas Moeller (1951–2011) was a United States Navy vice admiral who last served in active duty as the first deputy to the commander for military operations, U.S. Africa Command (USAFRICOM), until his departure in April 2010. USAFRICOM was formally stood up in October 2007, as a subunified command initially of U.S. European Command, under the command of General William E. Ward, who was first commander of USAFRICOM.

Moeller, a New Jersey native and son of a World War II navy veteran, graduated from the University of Notre Dame in 1974, receiving his commission from the Notre Dame Naval Reserve Officers Training Corps program.

Trained as a surface warfare officer, Moeller served in a variety of sea and shore assignments, including joint duty.

His CO tour in Belknap included initial Partnership for Peace operations, North Atlantic Treaty Organization Operation Provide Promise and Operation Deny Flight, and the first navy visits to Odessa, Ukraine and Novorossiysk, Russia. During his command of Port Royal, the ship received her third and fourth consecutive Battle E awards, and installed and employed Linebacker, the navy's first TBMD capability.

Ashore, Moeller served in the Office of the Chief of Naval Operations in the Systems Analysis Division (OP 96) as surface ASW and IUSS analyst; the Program Resource Appraisal Division (OP 91) as net assessment analyst; SECNAV Office of Program Appraisal (OPA) as surface warfare and C4I analyst; OSD's Office of Director Operational Test and Evaluation (DOT&E) as maritime warfare analyst; and commanding officer, Surface Warfare Officers School.

In 1989, Moeller was selected as the Navy Federal Executive Fellow at the Brookings Institution. He earned a master's degree in national security studies from the Edmund A. Walsh School of Foreign Service, Georgetown University.

Moeller served as deputy chief of staff for operations, plans, policy and training (N3N5N7) and as director for operations (J3), Joint Task Force (JTF) – 519 for the commander, U.S. Pacific Fleet from May 2001 through August 2003 and as Commander, Cruiser Destroyer Group 1/Commander, Ronald Reagan Strike Group from August 2003 through August 2004. Moeller served as the director of strategy, plans and policy (J5) and as special assistant to the commander, U.S. Central Command, from August 2004 through August 2007.

Moeller died on 28 March 2011 from Lou Gehrig's disease and is buried at Arlington National Cemetery. His awards include:

  Defense Superior Service Medal
  Legion of Merit with two Gold Stars
  Defense Meritorious Service Medal
  Meritorious Service Medal with two Gold Stars
  Navy and Marine Corps Commendation Medal with a Gold Star

Notes

References

External links

USAFRICOM official web site

1951 births
2011 deaths
University of Notre Dame alumni
Walsh School of Foreign Service alumni
United States Navy admirals
Recipients of the Legion of Merit
Recipients of the Defense Superior Service Medal
Burials at Arlington National Cemetery